Helen Jane Stewart (April 16, 1854 – March 6, 1926) was a Southern Nevada pioneer, and was considered the "first lady of Las Vegas". Stewart Avenue in Downtown Las Vegas is dedicated in her honor.

Biography
Helen Jane Wiser was born in Springfield, Illinois. Her father, Hiram Wiser, was a prospector who moved his family to Sacramento, California, where she attended school.

On April 6, 1873, she married Archibald Stewart and moved to Pony Springs near Pioche, Nevada. The Stewarts' first three children, William James (1874), Hiram Richard (1876), and Flora Eliza Jane (known as Tiza) (1879), were born in the Pioche area.

In April 1882, Stewart moved with her husband and children to the Las Vegas Valley to take possession of the Las Vegas Ranch (called the "Los Vegas Rancho" at the time so it wouldn't be confused with Las Vegas, New Mexico) from Octavius Gass, who had defaulted on a loan from Archibald Stewart. The Stewarts' fourth child, Evaline La Vega, was born in the Las Vegas Valley in 1882.  After her husband was shot and killed by a neighbor on July 13, 1884, Stewart, who was pregnant with her fifth child, Archibald Jr., tried unsuccessfully to sell the ranch.

With the help of her father, Hiram, she ran the ranch and began to purchase adjacent properties in anticipation of a railroad being built through the area. Stewart eventually became the largest landowner in Lincoln County, Nevada. 

In 1893, she became the first postmaster of Las Vegas (though the name was spelled "Los Vegas" until 1903). 

This land was established as the city of Las Vegas in 1905. In 1903, she married Frank Stewart (no relation to Archibald Stewart), who had been hired at the Las Vegas Ranch in 1886. She moved into a new home in the growing community of Las Vegas and became an important part of social, political, and business circles.

In 1916, Stewart became the first woman elected to the Clark County School District's Board of Trustees. She donated land in 1922 for the Las Vegas Grammar School, which was built in the following year. It was the first public school attended by Native American students from the Southern Paiute Indian Colony. The building was added to the National Register of Historic Places in 1979.

Stewart died in Las Vegas in 1926.

References

1854 births
1926 deaths
People from Springfield, Illinois
People from Las Vegas
People from Lincoln County, Nevada
Nevada postmasters
Clark County School District
Educators from Illinois
American women educators